The Match-e-be-nash-she-wish Band of Pottawatomi Indians of Michigan is a federally recognized tribe of Potawatomi people in Michigan named for a 19th-century Ojibwe chief. They were formerly known as the Gun Lake Band of Grand River Ottawa Indians, the United Nation of Chippewa, Ottawa and Pottawatomi Indians of Michigan, Inc., and the Gun Lake Tribe or Gun Lake Band. 
They are headquartered in Bradley, Michigan.

History
Ancestors of this mixed band belonged to the Ojibwe (Chippewa), Ottawa, and Pottawatomi peoples, who lived around the Great Lakes in what became Canada and the United States. The tribes tended to be highly decentralized, with most people living in bands. Under pressure and encroachment by Europeans, there were substantial population losses among the tribes, and some of their people moved west into Minnesota. Others remained in rural areas of Michigan and Wisconsin.

They all spoke Algonquian languages, part of a large language family extending from the Atlantic Coast and around the Great Lakes, and had some cultural similarities. Original members of the Gun Lake Band were survivors of these three tribes who gathered together in community near Gun Lake, Michigan.

Government
The Match-e-be-nash-she-wish Band of Pottawatomi Indians were recognized as a sovereign nation by the United States' federal government in 1988. It has a written constitution and elected democratic government, consisting of several tribal council members.

The current (3/6/23) Tribal Council is as follows:

Bob Peters, Tribal Chairman (Bradley District)
Jodie Palmer, Vice Chair (At-Large District)
Jeff Martin, Secretary (Salem District)
Nicole Overbeck, Treasurer (Bradley District)
Phyllis Davis, Council Member (At-Large District)
Ben Brenner, Council Member (Salem District)
Virginia Sprague-Vanderband (Bradley District)

Membership
The tribal council voted on rules for enrollment or membership in the tribe. As of 2009, the tribe's enrollment is open only to babies born to current tribal members.

The tribe says they are "a body of mixed-blood Chippewa, Ottawa, and Pottawatomi" who trace their descent from the principal chief Match-e-be-nash-she-wish. Under the Treaty of Chicago in 1821, the US government provided him and his followers with a reserve near Kalamazoo, Michigan.

Reservation

The Match-e-be-nash-she-wish Reservation is located in Wayland Township, south of the city of Wayland, Michigan. Since being recognized, the tribe was assigned land in trust by the federal government in 2005.

In 2009 under Carcieri v. Salazar, the US Supreme Court ruled that the government could not take land into trust for tribes that were recognized after the passage of the Indian Reorganization Act of 1934.

Congress in 2014 passed Public Law No: 113-179 (09/26/2014), a law to clarify that the Match-e-be-nash-she-wish Band's land trust assigned to them in 2005 could not be challenged in court under the United States Supreme Court decision of Carcieri v. Salazar.

Tribal enterprises
The primary tribal enterprise is the Gun Lake Casino. The first phase was built in 2009 on part of the 147 acres in Allegan County, Michigan that the tribe was given in January 2009 as a land base by the federal government. It generated 750 jobs during construction. The tribe estimated that it would attract 60,000 guests annually to area hotels. The tribe did not plan to build and operate a hotel. Further, they estimated the enterprise would bring 600 casino jobs.

The tribe publishes a newspaper, called The Tribal Tribune. They provide cultural workshops on traditional practices, such as cradle fire from flint, tapping and processing maple sugar, creating basswood and hemp dogbane cordage, snowsnakes or zhoshke'nayabo, and black ash basketry, a traditional art form among Michigan tribes.

Education
The reservation is served by Wayland Union Schools.

Notable members 

 Kelly Church, basket maker, birchbark bite, and Woodlands school painter 
 Match-E-Be-Nash-She-Wish, 18th- and 19th-century Ojibwe chief
 Cherish Parrish, basket maker, birchbark biter

References

External links
Match-e-be-nash-she-wish Band of Pottawatomi, official website
Potawatomi language materials provided by the tribe
Gun Lake Casino website
Native Americans in Michigan Databases, Mainly Michigan website, includes "Durant Roll of 1908" and "Mt. Pleasant Indian School Register (1893 to 1932)"

Allegan County, Michigan
American Indian reservations in Michigan
Anishinaabe communities in the United States
Anishinaabe reservations and tribal-areas in the United States
Federally recognized tribes in the United States
Great Lakes tribes
Indigenous peoples in the United States
Native American tribes in Michigan
Potawatomi